Amaurobius annulatus is a species of spider in the family Amaurobiidae, found in the Balkans.

References

annulatus
Spiders of Europe
Spiders described in 1906